WHTL-FM (102.3 FM) is a radio station licensed to Whitehall, Wisconsin. It plays a classic hits music format.

WHTL-FM came to the air in 1981, playing contemporary hit music, and has since had a variety of formats.  Currently, WHTL plays hits from the 1960s, 1970s and 1980s.  The station covers local high school sports in addition to carrying Green Bay Packers football games.

The station broadcasts 24 hours a day, 7 days a week with live broadcasting from 6A.M. until 6P.M. Monday-Friday. WHTL also broadcasts live for high school sports and numerous community events.  On air personalities are: Mike Gilbertson, Mark Ste. Marie, Steve Tudhope and Marty Little.  The station is owned by Eugene "Butch" Halama and the station manager is Barb Semb.

WHTL-FM's transmitter is located about 5 miles northeast of Whitehall and is on the highest point in Trempealeau County. WHTL's signal covers much of western Wisconsin including the nearby cities of Arcadia, Black River Falls, Neilsville, Eau Claire, Durand, Buffalo City, La Crosse, and Winona.

External links

HTL-FM
Classic hits radio stations in the United States
1981 establishments in Wisconsin
Radio stations established in 1981